Complete results for Women's Downhill competition at the 2009 World Championships.  Delayed a day by weather, it was run on February 9, the fifth race of the championships.

References
FIS-ski.com - official results
 Ski Racing.com - Worlds: Vonn wins her second gold medal - 09-Feb-2009

Women's downhill
2009 in French women's sport
FIS